Alberta Gardner (born April 12, 1954) is an American politician in the U.S. state of Alaska. She served as a Democratic member of the Alaska Legislature for fourteen years, from 2005 to 2019. Serving in both houses, the House and Senate, she represented midtown Anchorage. She was the Senate's minority leader for the last four years of her tenure.

External links

 Alaska State Legislature – Senator Berta Gardner official government website
 Project Vote Smart – Senator Berta Gardner (AK) profile
 Follow the Money – Berta Gardner
 2006 2004 campaign contributions
  Alaska Senate Democrats – Berta Gardner] profile
 Berta Gardner at 100 Years of Alaska's Legislature

1954 births
21st-century American politicians
21st-century American women politicians
Democratic Party Alaska state senators
Living people
Politicians from Anchorage, Alaska
Politicians from Salt Lake City
University of California, Riverside alumni
Women state legislators in Alaska